Gian Carlo Pallavicino (Genoa, 1722 - Genoa, 1794) was the 179th Doge of the Republic of Genoa.

Biography 
Pallavicino rose to dogal power with the election of 6 June 1785 where the members of the Grand Council preferred the candidacy of Gian Carlo Pallavicino, representative of that liberal faction that aimed to modernize the institutional structures of the Republic of Genoa, compared to other candidates and former doges Marco Antonio Gentile and Giovanni Battista Ayroli. In its two-year mandate, the one hundred and thirty-fourth in two-year succession and the one hundred and seventy-ninth in republican history, the first economic and literary society was established in Genoa, born in 1786 to promote agricultural, trade and art activities; from 1791 similar companies were founded in Chiavari, in Albenga and Savona. His Dogate ceased on June 6, 1787. Gian Carlo Pallavicino died in Genoa during 1794.

See also 

 Republic of Genoa
 Doge of Genoa
 Pallavicini family

References 

18th-century Doges of Genoa
1722 births
1794 deaths